The 1990 United States Senate election in Alabama was held on November 6, 1990. Incumbent Democratic U.S. Senator Howell Heflin won re-election to a third term. As of 2023, it is the last time a Democrat was elected to the Class 2 Senate seat in Alabama until 2017, and the last time overall in which a Democrat was elected to and served a full term in the U.S. Senate from Alabama.

Major candidates

Democratic 
 Howell Heflin, incumbent U.S. Senator since 1979

Republican 
 Bill Cabaniss, State Senator and former State Representative

Results

See also 
 1990 United States Senate elections

References 

Alabama
1990
1990 Alabama elections